Wojciechów is a village in Lublin County, Lublin Voivodeship, in eastern Poland. It is the seat of the gmina (administrative district) called Gmina Wojciechów.

The village has a population of 920.

References

Villages in Lublin County
Lesser Poland
Lublin Governorate
Lublin Voivodeship (1919–1939)